The Z. C. B. J. Hall, also known as Bohemian Hall or Zapadni Cesko Bratrske Jednota Hall, is an historic building located near Arthur, Wisconsin that was built in 1907.  It was listed on the National Register of Historic Places on June 25, 1992. It historically served as a meeting hall for the Czech community.

In 1896, after most pine was logged off in the town of Arthur, the Cypreanson Brothers of Eau Claire offered cut-over land for sale and hired Vincent Benish to advertise that land in Czech-language newspapers to immigrants in southwest Wisconsin. Many of these people had left their homeland unhappy with Habsburg rule and its links to the Catholic Church. As a result, many were skeptical of the church and open to Marxist ideas and the Freethought movement. Still, they needed funerals and weddings, and a way to socialize with their fellow Czechs. In 1904 the Arthur Czech community organized a chapter of the Zapadni Ceska Bratrska Jednota - Western Bohemian Fraternal Association.

In 1907 the members built their hall. The original section was 60 feet by 32 feet with a false-front parapet. In 1913 a foldable stage was added for performances by the "Goodwill Actors," who traveled around the state, presenting several Czech plays each year. In 1930 a stage and rear kitchen were added to the back of the building.  The exterior is sided with metal embossed to look like cement blocks and painted silver.

The hall hosted the weddings and funerals mentioned before, and also all-night dances and fraternal meetings. The organization lent money and provided insurance. From 1908 to 1934, the Czech language was taught in the summers. From 1928 to 1943 the hall hosted Sokol meetings, emphasizing gymnastics and patriotism with parallel bars, horizontal bars, rings, horse, marching, singing and folk dancing.

See also
 Czech-Slovak Protective Society

References

External links 
 ZCBJ - WFLA Lodge #141 Bratri Novych Hradu (Brothers of New Castles)

Western Fraternal Life Association
Czech-American culture in Wisconsin
Buildings and structures in Chippewa County, Wisconsin
Clubhouses on the National Register of Historic Places in Wisconsin
Buildings and structures completed in 1907
National Register of Historic Places in Chippewa County, Wisconsin
1907 establishments in Wisconsin